The Coocumbac Island Nature Reserve ( or ) is a protected nature reserve located in the midnorth coast region of New South Wales, Australia. The  reserve, situated on the Manning River near , is a rare example of a subtropical lowland rainforest.

Much of Australia's lowland sub tropical rainforest was cleared for housing and agriculture, leaving only small patches remaining, such as at Coocumbac Island. The soils are derived from the Manning River. These alluvial soils are enriched from basaltic deposits upstream at Barrington Tops and the Comboyne and Bulga plateaux.

Features

Fauna 
The most obvious mammal species on the island is the grey-headed flying fox, whose numbers may reach 5,000 at certain times of the year. Noteworthy birds occurring here include the osprey and wompoo fruit-dove.

Flora 
The ecological community on the island is known as the large fig - giant stinger tree association. The genus ficus is well represented, with several strangler fig species present. Particularly prominent are the large Moreton Bay figs. Other figs are deciduous fig, small leaf fig and watery fig. The town of Taree, takes its name from another of the local figs, the sandpaper fig.

Other tree species include stinging tree and the native olive. The native elm grows on the island, here at its southernmost point of natural distribution. Less common trees include white walnut and the Australian rose mahogany.

Rainforest regeneration programs have been put in place to encourage local rainforest species and suppress the problem of invasive weeds.

Mangroves 
Surrounding the island is an impressive community of two species of mangroves; grey mangrove and river mangrove.

Etymology 
Coocumbac means "meeting place" in the local indigenous Biripi language. Australian indigenous people regularly visited the rainforest for the collection of food, medicinal purposes, the collection of fibres for making bags and nets and social gatherings. The rainforest has spiritual significance to the traditional indigenous custodians.

See also

 Islands of New South Wales
 Protected areas of New South Wales

References

Nature reserves in New South Wales
Forests of New South Wales
Taree
Islands of New South Wales
1981 establishments in Australia
Protected areas established in 1981